= Village Where You Can Meet Statues =

- ふれあい石像の里
- Interactive map of Village Where You Can Meet Statues
- Location: Toyama Prefecture, Japan
- Nearest city: Toyama
- Coordinates: 36°32′40″N 137°13′53.5″E
- Established: 1989
- Status: opened

Village Where You Can Meet Statues (ふれあい石像の里, Fureai Sekibutsu no Sato) is located in Toyama, Toyama Prefecture, Japan, about 18 km south of the city. The site was built in 1989 by Mutsuo Furukawa, a local businessman. He wanted to build a space where people could relax and meditate in a natural setting. To fulfil this wish, Furukawa commissioned Chinese master artist Lu Jinqiao to create more than 800 sculptures. As these heavy sculptures could not be flown in en mass, they were delivered via the Jinzu River. Some of the sculptures resemble people Furukawa knew in life; friends, family, colleagues and employees. Others are representations of Chinese and Japanese folklore, zodiac animals, historical figures and Buddhist icons.

Furukawa reportedly spent over ¥6 billion building the park. After he died in 2012 the park fell into neglect. The place was later rediscovered by a Japanese photographer and has since become a somewhat popular tourist attraction. The park is currently run and maintained by volunteers.
